"Ain't Got No Home" is a song written and originally recorded by American rhythm-and-blues singer and pianist Clarence "Frogman" Henry. It was released as a single in the United States on December 15, 1956.

The first verse of the song is sung in a man's voice, the second in a falsetto and the third in a frog's voice.

In the United States, the song reached no. 3 on one of the Billboard R&B charts and no. 20 on the Billboard pop chart, the Top 100.

History 
Clarence Henry used his trademark croak to improvise the song "Ain't Got No Home" one night in 1955. Chess Records' A&R man Paul Gayten heard the song, and had Henry record it in Cosimo Matassa's studio in September 1956.  Initially promoted by local DJ Poppa Stoppa, the song eventually rose to number 3 on the national R&B chart and number 20 on the US pop chart.  The gimmick earned Henry his nickname of "Frogman" and jump-started a career that endures to this day.

The song was the first big hit released on the Chess subsidiary Argo Records.

It was used in the 1987 film The Lost Boys and the 1995 Martin Scorsese movie Casino.

Accolades 
The song is ranked no. 98 on the NME magazine's list of 100 Best Songs of the 1950s.

Track listings 
7" single (1956) – Argo Record Corp., cat. no. Arc Music 5259 (US)
 "Ain't Got No Home" (2:23)
 "Troubles, Troubles" (2:15)

7" single (1966) – London Records HLU 10025 (UK), Parrot 45 PAR 10822 (US)
 "Ain't Got No Home"
 "Baby Ain't That Love"

Cover versions 
The song has been covered by many artists including The Band, Suzi Quatro, Buddy Holly,  the New York Dolls, and Jackie Edwards. In Rod Stewart's version of the song "Some Guys Have All the Luck", Stewart incorporates the vocal refrain from "Ain't Got No Home" as an homage. The song was a favorite of Madeline Kahn, who performed it on Saturday Night Live on December 16, 1995. Steve Miller incorporates some of the vocal lines from the song on the track "Just A Little Bit" on his 1988 Born 2B Blue album.

References

External links 
 Clarence "Frogman" Henry – "Ain't Got No Home / Troubles, Troubles" (1956 single) on Discogs
 Clarence "Frogman" Henry – "Ain't Got No Home" (1966 single) on Discogs

1956 songs
1956 singles
Clarence "Frogman" Henry songs
Argo Records singles